The Huckleberry Creek Patrol Cabin is located in the northern portion of Mount Rainier National Park, Washington, United States. It was built around 1934 to house rangers on patrol within the park. The log cabin's design resembles the "Standard Plan for Patrol Cabins" prepared by the Western Division of the National Park Service, with the addition of a full-width front porch. Civilian Conservation Corps labor may have been used in the construction of the cabin.

The cabin was placed on the National Register of Historic Places on March 13, 1991. It is part of the Mount Rainier National Historic Landmark District, which encompasses the entire park and which recognizes the park's inventory of Park Service-designed rustic architecture.

References

Ranger stations in Mount Rainier National Park
Government buildings completed in 1934
Park buildings and structures on the National Register of Historic Places in Washington (state)
Buildings and structures in Pierce County, Washington
Civilian Conservation Corps in Washington (state)
Log cabins in the United States
National Register of Historic Places in Mount Rainier National Park
Log buildings and structures on the National Register of Historic Places in Washington (state)
1934 establishments in Washington (state)